Carlo Antonio Buffagnotti was an Italian painter of the late-Baroque, active as a painter of perspective and theatrical decorations at Bologna and Genoa about 1690. He engraved a series of architectural subjects, and decorations for the theatre, after Francesco Galli Bibiena, and others after Marcantonio Chiarini.

References

17th-century Italian painters
Italian male painters
Painters from Genoa
Painters from Bologna
Italian Baroque painters
Italian scenic designers
Year of birth unknown
Year of death unknown